South Hinksey is a village and civil parish just over  south of the centre of Oxford. The parish was part of Berkshire until the 1974 boundary changes transferred it to Oxfordshire.

Geography
The Southern By-Pass Road (part of the A34) passes through the parish.  The only road access to the village is via the bypass. It is on the inside of the ring road and close to the Hinksey Stream, a branch of the River Thames at Oxford. Pedestrian and cycle access to the village from Oxford is via the Devil's Backbone; a historic raised pathway across the neighbouring flood plains that features in Matthew Arnold's poem The Scholar Gipsy.

History
It has always been difficult to get between North Hinksey to the north-west and South Hinksey. In the 19th century John Ruskin tried to organize the making of a road between the two villages, as the ground between them was very boggy. Since the 1930s they have been connected by the Southern By-Pass Road.  Until the middle of the 18th century South Hinksey was in the parish of Cumnor. When it was first created, the parish extended to the River Thames, but in 1889 the new suburb of New Hinksey, between the Thames and Hinksey Stream, was transferred to the City of Oxford. However, the ecclesiastical parish continues to include New Hinksey.

See also

 Hinksey
 Hinksey Stream
 New Hinksey
 North Hinksey

References

Sources

External links

Berkshire History website information

Villages in Oxfordshire
Civil parishes in Oxfordshire